Breath Hill is a mountain located in the Catskill Mountains of New York southwest of West Shokan. Little Rocky is located southeast, and Balsam Cap is located north of Breath Hill.

References

Mountains of Ulster County, New York
Mountains of New York (state)